Steven Michael Webb (born 8 November 1984 in Wirral, Merseyside, England) is an English actor in theatre, television and film.

Career
Webb began acting at the age of eight. After taking over the lead role in Oliver! at the London Palladium at age 10, Webb enrolled at Sylvia Young Theatre School. He appeared as a child dancer alongside Michael Jackson during the 1996 Brit Awards; getting knocked off stage and cracking a rib when Jarvis Cocker came on. His most notable theatre work includes appearing as Posner in the second casting of Alan Bennett's The History Boys and as Elder McKinley and Moroni in the West End run of The Book of Mormon.

Television work includes the BBC series The Magician's House which featured actors such as Katie Stuart, Ian Richardson, Stephen Fry and Jennifer Saunders. He has also appeared in the ITV drama series, Bad Girls (2001, 2006) in which he played David Saunders, son of inmate Julie Saunders. More recently he has appeared in episodes of Miranda and The Inbetweeners.

He is the host of the podcast Brain Rot, which discusses classic horror movies.

Personal life
Webb is bisexual.

He was previously in a relationship with Stephen Fry.

In 2022 he announced he was two years sober.

Awards and recognition
 2011 – Broadway World West End Awards for Best Featured Actor in a Musical: Nominated, Betwixt! (Cast Member)
 2003 – Evening Standard Theatre Awards for Most Outstanding Newcomer: Nominated, The Trestle at Pope Lick Creek (Cast Member)
 2000 – BAFTA Children's Awards for Best Drama: Nominated, Magician's House (Cast Member)
 2000 – Children and Young People International Emmy Award: Magician's House (Cast Member)

Work

Theatre

Television

Audio

Film

References

External links 
 
Profile at National Theatre Website
Profile at Talented British Actors

1984 births
Living people
English male child actors
English male film actors
English male musical theatre actors
English male radio actors
English male stage actors
English male television actors
English male voice actors
Male actors from Merseyside
Alumni of the Sylvia Young Theatre School
People from the Metropolitan Borough of Wirral
English gay actors